Mokhele Khotso David Kenneth is a businessman and the special advisor to the South African minister of science and technology. He is  the chancellor of the University of the Free State, the founder and president of the South African National Research Foundation and Academy of Science of South Africa. He is the lead independent of non-executive director of MTN Group.

Early life and education 

Khotso Mokhele was born in Bloemfontein. He attended Moroka High School and he obtained his first degree in agriculture from the University of Fort Hare. He obtained his master's degree in Food Science and PhD in Microbiology from the University of California under the scholarship of Fulbright-Hays Programme. After that, he did his postdoctoral fellowships at the Johns Hopkins University and the University of Pennsylvania in the USA. He has also received eight honorary degrees across South African Universities and the US.

Career

Academic career 

Khotso Mokhele began his career as a lecturer at the University of Fort Hare between 1987 and 1989 and spent two years at the University of Cape Town. In 1992 he joined Foundation for Research Development as one of its vice presidents and succeeded Dr Rein Arndt as the president in 1996.

Scientific career 

He was one of the scientists that drafted the blueprint of  science and technology in South Africa. He was the founder president of the Academy of Science of South Africa (ASSAF), a two-times member of the Advisory Council on Innovation to the Minister of Science and Technology and was also a vice-president of Scientific Planning and Review of the International Council for Science (ICSU)

Leadership and corporate career 
Khotso Mokhele was a Non-Executive chairman at Impala Platinum Holdings Ltd., A Chairman of Tiger Brands Ltd., Chairman & chief executive officer at ArcelorMittal South Africa Ltd., Lead Independent non-executive director at African Oxygen Ltd., and Non-Executive chairman for Adcock Ingram Holdings Ltd. President & chief executive officer of National Research Foundation, President of Academy of Science of South Africa and President at National Research Foundation.

He is currently the Lead Independent non-executive director at MTN Group,  Afrox Limited and a non-executive director of Hans Merensky Holdings (Pty) Limited

Awards and honours 
He was awarded the Chevalier of the Legion of Honour by the President of France. In 2009 he received the Technology Top 100 Lifetime Achievers Award and in 2015 he received the Science Diplomacy Award from the Minister of Science and Technology in South Africa.

References 

MTN Group
Chancellors of the University of the Free State
University of Fort Hare alumni
University of California alumni
Living people
Fellows of the African Academy of Sciences
Honorary Fellows of the African Academy of Sciences
Year of birth missing (living people)